Mount Alberts is a pointed, almost completely snow-covered mountain rising to about , and situated  east of Mount Phillips on the east margin of the Malta Plateau, Borchgrevink Coast, western Victoria Land, Antarctica. The mountain stands immediately south of the terminus of Line Glacier and overlooks the west margin of the Ross Sea. This feature was so named by the New Zealand Geographic Board in 1966 after Fred G. Alberts, Geographer, U.S. Department of the Interior (later with the Defense Mapping Agency Topographic Center), who served as Secretary to the Advisory Committee on Antarctic Names, U.S. Board on Geographic Names, 1949–80, and was compiler and editor of the United States Geological Survey Gazetteer.

References

Mountains of Victoria Land
Borchgrevink Coast
Two-thousanders of Antarctica